Superman's Pal Jimmy Olsen is an American comic book series published by DC Comics from September–October 1954 until March 1974, spanning a total of 163 issues. Featuring the adventures of Superman supporting character Jimmy Olsen, it contains stories often of a humorous nature.

Publication history
The 1952 television series Adventures of Superman co-starred actor Jack Larson, who appeared regularly as Jimmy Olsen.  Largely because of the popularity of Larson and his portrayal of the character, National Comics Publications (DC Comics) decided to create a regular title featuring Jimmy as the leading character, which debuted with a September–October 1954 cover date. Curt Swan was the main artist on the series for its first decade.

In 1958, a second title was introduced, Superman's Girl Friend, Lois Lane, which revolves around another supporting character in a similar fashion.

Lucy Lane was introduced in issue #36 (April 1959) and became an on-again, off-again romantic interest of Jimmy Olsen. In issue #57, he marries Supergirl (Kara Zor-El/Linda Lee Danvers) after she loses both her powers and memories of being Supergirl, only for her to recover her powers and memories after their marriage; once she lets him know that she is Supergirl, he is perfectly happy with it. She was also the anonymous "Miss X" whom Jimmy kissed in issue #44 to break the spell that turned him into a werewolf.

When Jack Kirby began working at DC in 1970, he insisted on taking on this title since it was the lowest-selling in the publishing line and without assigned talent at the time, so he would not cost someone their job. Kirby's first issue was #133 (August 1970), and made a very clear break between the old style and the new.

During his run, Kirby introduced many memorable characters, notably the Fourth World's New Gods, Darkseid, Project Cadmus and Transilvane. He also reintroduced the Newsboy Legion and the Guardian. The faces of the Superman and Jimmy Olsen figures drawn by Kirby were redrawn by Al Plastino or Murphy Anderson. Comedian Don Rickles guest starred in a two-part story by Kirby in issues #139 and #141. Kirby left the series with issue #148 (April 1972).

Lucy Lane was believed to have died in Superman's Girl Friend, Lois Lane #120 (March 1972) but was later revived in a story in Superman's Pal Jimmy Olsen #160 (October 1973). Nick Cardy was the cover artist for Superman's Pal Jimmy Olsen for issues #154–163.

Superman's Pal Jimmy Olsen; Superman's Girl Friend, Lois Lane; and the short-lived Supergirl title (launched in 1972) ended in 1974 by merging into the new omnibus title The Superman Family. The new series continued the numbering from Superman's Pal Jimmy Olsen. Superman Family itself was canceled in 1982.

A Superman's Pal Jimmy Olsen special one-shot was published in December 2008, following on from the "Atlas" storyline, and leading into Superman: New Krypton.

Jimmy's transformations
Many of the issues include Jimmy undergoing some form of transformation. These include:

 Speed Demon - In 1956, a month before the debut of Barry Allen as the new Flash, Jimmy drank a potion produced by a Professor Claude and briefly gained super-speed.
 Jimmy the Imp - An prankster imp vision of Jimmy.
 Colossal Olsen - A Colossal Kid version of Jimmy Olsen.
 Radioactivity - After being exposed to a radioactive substance, Jimmy began to irradiate everything in his presence.
 Super-Brain - Jimmy briefly evolved into a "man of the future" with superhuman mental powers.
 Monstrous beard growth - The machinations of the sinister Beard Band cause Jimmy to grow an immense beard.
 Gorilla - When Jimmy switched minds with a gorilla, he went about his reporting duties as a gorilla in Jimmy's clothes.
 Elastic Lad - As Elastic Lad, Jimmy, by serum or by alien virus could sometimes stretch himself, akin to the recently reintroduced Plastic Man. As Elastic Lad, Jimmy was inducted as an Honorary Member of the Legion of Super-Heroes.
 Alien-form - Aliens transformed Jimmy into a telepathic Jovian for a week. This turned out to be a Jovian week which is much shorter than an Earth week, about 70 hours (slightly less than three days).
 Fire-Breather - An accident involving an experiment gave Jimmy fire-breath.
 Human Octopus - After eating an extraterrestrial fruit, Jimmy grew four extra arms. According to Superman, this was actually a hallucination, but Jimmy suspected that Superman said this to teach him a lesson since Jimmy had foolishly ignored advice from the Man of Steel that would have saved him a lot of trouble.
 Genie - Jimmy found a genie's lamp and was tricked into replacing its villainous occupant.
 Wolf-Man - In the vein of the 1957 Michael Landon film I Was a Teenage Werewolf, Jimmy found himself transformed into a werewolf.
 Woman - Jimmy would occasionally go undercover dressed as a woman in #44, #67, #84, and #159.
 Morbidly Obese - Jimmy tried to get fat in an attempt to stop a jewel smuggler and to impress a Circus Fat Lady.
 Giant Turtle Man - One of Jimmy's most frequently cited transformations was that of his turning into a giant turtle man.
 Human Porcupine - Jimmy transformed after rejecting the romantic advances of an imp from the Fifth Dimension.
 Bizarro Jimmy - Although Jimmy has a counterpart on Bizarro World, he was briefly turned into a Bizarro himself.
 Hippie - Investigating a colony of hippies at "Guru Kama's Dream Pad", Jimmy grew a beard and participated in a mock "hate-in". On the cover of this story's issue, Jimmy is wielding a sign that says "Superman is a freak-out!"
 Viking - Jimmy put on Viking armor and mistakenly believed he had been transported 1,000 years backward in time.

Proposed TV series
In 1959, the producers of the action/adventure series Adventures of Superman were hit by a snag as to how revive the now-canceled series after series star George Reeves had died that summer from a gunshot wound. Jack Larson, who played Jimmy in the series, was approached with the idea of continuing the franchise as a spin-off for two new seasons of 26 episodes each to begin airing in 1960. Titled Superman's Pal Jimmy Olsen, it would focus on a more serious angle of Olsen's rising career as a reporter and journalist with Larson reprising his role. In place of Reeves, stock footage of Superman flying and a look-alike stunt double would be used to play the Man of Steel. Disgusted at the thought of the producers trying to cash in and make money over the death of Reeves, Larson rejected the proposal, and the project went unmade.

Collected editions
 Showcase Presents: Superman Family 
 Volume 1 includes Superman's Pal Jimmy Olsen #1–22, 576 pages, March 2006, 
 Volume 2 includes Superman's Pal Jimmy Olsen #23–34, 520 pages, February 2008, 
 Volume 3 includes Superman's Pal Jimmy Olsen #35–44, 576 pages, March 2009, 
 Volume 4 includes Superman's Pal Jimmy Olsen #45–53, 520 pages, March 2013,  
 Superman: The Amazing Transformations of Jimmy Olsen includes stories from Superman's Pal Jimmy Olsen #22, 28, 31–33, 41–42, 44, 49, 53, 59, 65, 72, 80, 85, and 105, 192 pages, July 2007, 
 Showcase Presents: Supergirl Volume 1 includes Superman's Pal Jimmy Olsen #40, 46, and 51, 528 pages, November 2007, 
 Superman: The Bottle City of Kandor includes Superman’s Pal Jimmy Olsen #53 and 69, 200 pages, October 2007, 
 DC’s Greatest Imaginary Stories, Vol. 1 includes Superman’s Pal Jimmy Olsen #57, 192 pages, September 2005, 
 Legion of Super-Heroes Archives
 Volume 2 includes Superman's Pal Jimmy Olsen #72, 224 pages, 1992,  
 Volume 3 includes Superman's Pal Jimmy Olsen #76, 224 pages, 1993, 
 Volume 7 includes Superman's Pal Jimmy Olsen #106, 240 pages, May 1998, 
 Jimmy Olsen: Adventures by Jack Kirby 
 Volume 1, collects Superman's Pal Jimmy Olsen #133–139, and 141, 160 pages, August 2003, 
 Volume 2, collects Superman's Pal Jimmy Olsen #142–148, 192 pages, December 2004, 
 Jack Kirby's Fourth World Omnibus 
 Volume 1 includes Superman's Pal Jimmy Olsen #133–139, 396 pages, May 2007, 
 Volume 2 includes Superman's Pal Jimmy Olsen #141–145, 396 pages, August 2007,  
 Volume 3  includes Superman's Pal Jimmy Olsen #146–148, 396 pages, November 2007, 
 Countdown Special: Jimmy Olsen #1 (January 2008): collects Superman's Pal Jimmy Olsen #136 and #147–148.

See also
 Jack Kirby bibliography
 Superman's Girl Friend, Lois Lane
 The Superman Family

References

External links
 
 Superman's Pal Jimmy Olsen at Mike's Amazing World of Comics
 

1954 comics debuts
1974 comics endings
American comics characters
Comics spin-offs
DC Comics titles
Humor comics
Fourth World (comics)
Superhero comics
Superman titles